Ole Christian Strømberg (born 24 October 1972) is a Norwegian bobsledder, born in Narvik. He competed at the 2002 Winter Olympics in Salt Lake City, in men's four, together with Arnfinn Kristiansen, Mariusz Musial and Bjarne Røyland.

References

External links

1972 births
Living people
People from Narvik
Norwegian male bobsledders
Olympic bobsledders of Norway
Bobsledders at the 2002 Winter Olympics
Sportspeople from Nordland